Possum Walk Creek (also called Possum Branch) is a stream in Audrain County in the U.S. state of Missouri. It is a tributary of Mayes Branch.

Possum Walk Creek was named for the abundance of opossums along its course.

See also
List of rivers of Missouri

References

Rivers of Audrain County, Missouri
Rivers of Missouri